Cobalt(II) oxide is an inorganic compound that has been described as an olive-green or gray solid. It is used extensively in the ceramics industry as an additive to create blue colored glazes and enamels as well as in the chemical industry for producing cobalt(II) salts.  A related material is cobalt(II,III) oxide, a black solid with the formula Co3O4.

Structure and properties 
CoO crystals adopt the periclase (rock salt) structure with a lattice constant of 4.2615 Å.

It is antiferromagnetic below 16 °C.

Preparation
Cobalt(II) oxide is prepared by oxidation of cobalt powder with air or by thermal decomposition of cobalt(II) nitrate or the carbonate.

Cobalt(II,III) oxide decomposes to cobalt(II) oxide at 950 °C:
2 Co3O4 → 6 CoO + O2

It may also be prepared by precipitating the hydroxide, followed by thermal dehydration:
 CoX2 + 2 KOH → Co(OH)2 + 2 KX
 Co(OH)2 → CoO + H2O

Reactions
As can be expected, cobalt(II) oxide reacts with mineral acids to form the corresponding cobalt salts:
 CoO + 2 HX → CoX2 + H2O

Applications
Cobalt(II) oxide has for centuries been used as a coloring agent on kiln fired pottery. The additive provides a deep shade of blue named cobalt blue. The band gap (CoO) is around 2.4 eV.
It also is used in cobalt blue glass.

See also
Cobalt oxide nanoparticles
Cobalt
Cobalt(II,III) oxide

References 

Cobalt(II) compounds
Transition metal oxides
Rock salt crystal structure